Unemployment Indemnity (Shipwreck) Convention, 1920 is  an International Labour Organization Convention.

It was established in 1920:
Having decided upon the adoption of certain proposals with regard to the "supervision of articles of agreement; provision of facilities for finding employment for seamen; application to seamen of the Convention and Recommendations adopted at Washington in November last in regard to unemployment and unemployment insurance",...

Ratifications
As of 2013, the convention has been ratified by 60 states. Of the ratifying states, 45 have subsequently denounced the treaty automatically.

External links 
Text.
Ratifications and denunciations.

Unemployment
International Labour Organization conventions
Treaties concluded in 1920
Treaties entered into force in 1923
Treaties of Argentina
Treaties of Belgium
Treaties of Belize
Treaties of Bosnia and Herzegovina
Treaties of Chile
Treaties of Colombia
Treaties of Costa Rica
Treaties of Cuba
Treaties of Dominica
Treaties of Estonia
Treaties of Fiji
Treaties of the French Third Republic
Treaties of the Weimar Republic
Treaties of Ghana
Treaties of Grenada
Treaties of the Iraqi Republic (1958–1968)
Treaties of the Irish Free State
Treaties of the Kingdom of Italy (1861–1946)
Treaties of Jamaica
Treaties of Japan
Treaties of Lebanon
Treaties of Mauritius
Treaties of Mexico
Treaties of Montenegro
Treaties of New Zealand
Treaties of Nicaragua
Treaties of Nigeria
Treaties of Panama
Treaties of Papua New Guinea
Treaties of Peru
Treaties of Portugal
Treaties of the Kingdom of Romania
Treaties of Saint Lucia
Treaties of Serbia and Montenegro
Treaties of Seychelles
Treaties of Sierra Leone
Treaties of Slovenia
Treaties of the Solomon Islands
Treaties of the Dominion of Ceylon
Treaties of North Macedonia
Treaties of Tunisia
Treaties of the United Kingdom
Treaties of Uruguay
Admiralty law treaties
Treaties extended to Curaçao and Dependencies
Treaties extended to the Territory of Papua and New Guinea
Treaties extended to the Faroe Islands
Treaties extended to Guadeloupe
Treaties extended to French Guiana
Treaties extended to Martinique
Treaties extended to Réunion
Treaties extended to the West Indies Federation
Treaties extended to British Honduras
Treaties extended to the British Virgin Islands
Treaties extended to Brunei (protectorate)
Treaties extended to the Falkland Islands
Treaties extended to the Colony of Fiji
Treaties extended to the Gambia Colony and Protectorate
Treaties extended to Gibraltar
Treaties extended to Guernsey
Treaties extended to British Guiana
Treaties extended to Jersey
Treaties extended to the Crown Colony of Malta
Treaties extended to the Isle of Man
Treaties extended to British Mauritius
Treaties extended to Saint Helena, Ascension and Tristan da Cunha
Treaties extended to the Crown Colony of Seychelles
Treaties extended to the Crown Colony of Singapore
Treaties extended to the British Solomon Islands
Treaties extended to the French Southern and Antarctic Lands
1920 in labor relations